Abdelaziz Benhamlat (born March 22, 1974, in Hussein Dey, Algiers Province) is a retired Algerian international footballer. He played as a defender.

Benhamlat spent the majority of his career with JS Kabylie and had stints with RC Kouba, MC Alger and NA Hussein Dey.

National team statistics

Honours
Club:
 Won the Algerian League once with JS Kabylie in 1995
 Won the Algerian Cup twice with JS Kabylie in 1992 and 1994
 Won the Algerian Super Cup once with JS Kabylie in 1992
 Won the CAF Cup Winners' Cup once with JS Kabylie in 1995
 Won the CAF Cup three times with JS Kabylie in 2000, 2001 and 2002
Country:
 Has 27 caps for the Algerian National Team
 Played twice in the African Cup of Nations: 1998 and 2000

References

 

1974 births
Living people
People from Hussein Dey (commune)
Algerian footballers
Algeria international footballers
1998 African Cup of Nations players
2000 African Cup of Nations players
Competitors at the 1993 Mediterranean Games
Mediterranean Games silver medalists for Algeria
JS Kabylie players
RC Kouba players
MC Alger players
Association football defenders
Mediterranean Games medalists in football
21st-century Algerian people